The gene rpoE (RNA polymerase, extracytoplasmic E) encodes the sigma factor sigma-24 (σ24, sigma E, or RpoE), a protein in Escherichia coli and other species of bacteria. Depending on the bacterial species, this gene may be referred to as sigE.

RpoE appears to be necessary for the exocytoplasmic stress response. E. coli mutants without rpoE cannot grow at high temperatures (that is, above 42 degrees C) and show growth defects at lower temperatures, though this may be due to compensatory mutations. In some bacterial species, such as Clostridium botulinum, this sigma factor may be necessary for sporulation.

The stress response regulation activities of RpoE are modulated by the Hfq protein in E. coli.

References 

Escherichia coli genes